The 1984 Gloucester City Council election took place on 1 May 1984 to elect members of Gloucester City Council in England.

Results 

|}

Ward results

Barnwood

Barton

Eastgate

Hucclecote

Kingsholm

Linden

Longlevens

Matson

Podsmead

Tuffley

Westgate

References

1984 English local elections
1984
1980s in Gloucestershire